There are many present and past designs of webbing equipmentload-carrying aids mainly of military application.

0-9
 1908 Pattern Webbing
 1937 Pattern Webbing - UK, 1937 onwards
 1942 battle jerkin
 1970 pattern webbing
 44 pattern webbing
 58 pattern webbing - UK, 1958 to 1990s
 61 pattern webbing
 72 pattern webbing
 85 Pattern Personal Load Carrying Equipment  (PLCE)
 90 Pattern PLCE
 95 Pattern PLCE

A
 All-purpose Lightweight Individual Carrying Equipment (ALICE) - US, 1973
 ARVN Rucksack

B
 Bataleur 90
 Buzo Tactico Assault Vest

C
 Correaje argentino de cuero
 Correaje Tempex

F
 Fireforce webbing

I
 Improved Load Bearing Equipment
 Individual Integrated Fighting System

M
 M-1956 Load-Carrying Equipment
 Modernized Load-Carrying Equipment (M-1967)
 MOLLE (Modular Lightweight Load-carrying Equipment)

N
 Niemoller battle vest

O
 One Zero assault vest

P
 Personal Load Carrying Equipment
 Pouch Attachment Ladder System

R
 Recce battle vest

U
 UTV webbing

Webbing
Personal military carrying equipment